The Currie Undergraduate Scholarship (formerly known as the Blake-Kirkpatrick scholarship) is Atlantic Canada's largest undergraduate scholarship, and is awarded to four students each year by the University of New Brunswick. It was established in 2004 by the university's chancellor, Richard Currie.

Criteria
Applicants should submit an essay (not less than 250 words) to the Selection Committee giving evidence of their leadership capabilities, including (but not limited to) school and extracurricular activities. Also required in the essay is evidence of overcoming barriers or difficult situations. Applications not meeting all three criteria will automatically be disregarded.

Value of the Scholarship
The value of the scholarship used to depend on the university program chosen by the winner.  However, since the Engineering programs have been reduced to four years, the value of the scholarship remains constant from program to program.

Each scholarship winner is awarded $65,000 over four (4) years as follows:

Year 1: $20,000
Year 2: $20,000
Year 3: $15,000
Year 4: $10,000

Selection Committee
The selection committee consists of:
Mrs. C. Elizabeth Meier, B.A. '71, M.Sc. '75, B.Sc.N. '86;
Rev. James W. Golding L.Th. '63;
and Dr. Earle W. Wood, B.Sc. '59, BEd '66, M.A. '69, LL.D. '98.

Previous winners
The previous winners by year:

2019
Barakat Alabbas (Fredericton, NB) E
Joshua Kammermann (Riverview, NB) E
Julia MacPherson (Quispamsis, NB) E
Dustin McKee (Saint John, NB) O
Sarah Ross (Sussex, NB) O

2018
Alexandre Banks (Saint John, NB) E
Mackenzie Comeau (Saint John, NB) E
Cassie Doiron (Charlottetown, PE) E
Mila Veljanovska (Saint John, NB) O

2017
Madelyn Doucette (St. Louis, PE)E
Morgan Meade (Mount Moriah, NL) O
Taylor Milbury (Bear River, NS) O
Colin Brown (Grand Bay, NB) E

2016
Hannah Wood (Fredericton, NB) E
Brittany Landry (Miramichi, NB) O
Emma Collings (Montague, PE) O
Tyler Adams (Saint John, NB) O
Barry Riordon (Pokeshaw, NB) E

2015
Mansa Agbaku O
Luke Walker
Corinne Trottier
2011
Katie Wallace O
Jonathan Kummer E
Jeffrey LeBlanc E
Emma Jost E
Alex Briggs E

2010

Justin Lawson (Cail's Mills, NB) O
Lee Chapman (Smithfield, NB) O
Shannon LeBlanc (Margaree, NS) E

2009
Deidre Allaby (Woodstock, NB) O
Michelle Plante (Riverview, NB) E
Travis Payne (Bathurst, NB) E
Keillor Steeves (Moncton, NB) O

2008
Bradley Poirier (Moncton, NB) E
Desmond Connolly (Miramichi, NB) O
Lauren Henderson (Saint John, NB) O
Layton Reynolds (Lutes Mountain, NB) O
Taylor Steele (Truro, NS) E

2007
Allan Kember (Summerside, PEI) E
Laura Higgins (Saint John, NB) O
Coleman Ward (Weymouth, NS) E
Zach McNeil (Bridgetown, NS) E

2006
Jonathan O'Kane (Saint John, NB) O
Kristen Murray (Charlottetown, PEI) O
Miles Goff (Wickham, NB) O
Tyler Edwards (Canterbury, NB) E

2005
Ryan Brideau (Miramichi, NB) O
Holly Sampson (Glace Bay, NS) E
Sarah Schwartz (Deer Lake, NL) O
Brandon Wilbur (Hampton, NB) E

2004
Sean Hayman (St. Stephen, NB) E
Megan Hurley (Hampton, NB) O
Brendan Wood (Deer Lake, NL) E
Jessica Yeates (Fredericton, NB) O

E - Entering an engineering program.O - Entering a program other than engineering.

References

University of New Brunswick
Scholarships in Canada